"Oklahoma Sunday Morning" is a song written by Tony Macaulay, Albert Hammond and Lee Hazlewood. It was recorded by American country music artist Glen Campbell and released in December 1971 as a single. The song peaked at number 15 on the U.S. Billboard Hot Country Singles chart and number 9 the RPM Country Tracks chart in Canada.

Chart performance

References

1971 singles
Glen Campbell songs
Songs written by Tony Macaulay
Songs written by Albert Hammond
Songs written by Lee Hazlewood
Capitol Records singles
1971 songs
Song recordings produced by Al De Lory